The 1361 Class were small  steam locomotives built by the Great Western Railway at their Swindon railway works, England, mainly for shunting in docks and other sidings where track curvature was too tight for large locomotives.

History

The 1361 Class were designed by George Jackson Churchward as an update of the 1392 Class, originally built in 1874 for the Cornwall Minerals Railway. As such they combined unusual and outdated elements, such as saddle tanks and Allan valve gear, with current Great Western details such as the cab, bunker and many minor fittings. G.W.R.  were generally being converted to have Belpaire fireboxes and pannier tanks by this date, but the firebox on the 1361 was round topped, so the saddle tank was more appropriate. The  wheelbase allowed them to negotiate  radius curves, a feature necessary for their intended duties in docks and on lightly laid branch lines. Although, as is conventional, the design is credited to the C.M.E., Harold Holcroft was the junior draughtsman who did all the actual work on the class.

The five locomotives were built at Swindon in 1910 and were set to work alongside the ex-Cornwall Minerals Railway locomotives. Their usual home was Plymouth Millbay, Devon, (later Laira shed) from where they worked in Millbay Docks and on the Sutton Harbour branch. Until 1928 some of the locomotives could also be found at St Blazey engine shed, Cornwall, where they worked on ex-Cornwall Minerals Railway branches, and also at Moorswater for working the Looe branch.

In 1920 one locomotive was transferred to Newton Abbot, Devon, for shunting the railway workshops there, a duty that was to continue until 1952. Other allocations were Taunton (1953–1961) for working at Bridgwater, Somerset, (again, mainly in the town's docks), and Swindon (1956–1961). One was tried briefly on the Weymouth Harbour Tramway in 1949, and another went to St Philips Marsh, Bristol in 1962.

The same basic design was used for the six 1366 Class locomotives built in 1934, but this time they were fitted with Belpaire fireboxes, pannier tanks and more modern cabs. When the 1361s were withdrawn their remaining duties were given to D2000 diesel shunters. All 5 locomotives served over 50 years of service.

Preservation
One member of the 1361 class, No. 1363, was purchased for preservation by a group of members from the Great Western Society in 1964, two years after it was withdrawn from British Railways service at Laira. It was run to Totnes on the South Devon Railway under its own steam, and was restored there. No. 1363 is based at the Didcot Railway Centre, and as of 2014 was dismantled for overhaul to working order.

Locomotives

Models
Kernow Model Rail Centre announced plans in 2014 to manufacture an 00 gauge model of the 1361 class in conjunction with DJ Models. The model is being made in partnership with the Great Western Society at Didcot. Heljan models announced in 2015 plans to also manufacture a model of this class. Both manufacturers are offering the same livery variants (in some cases on the same locomotive modelled), and similar prices. Heljan's model was released in early 2017 in conjunction with a GWR 1366 class. Kernow's model, produced by DJ Models, was released in March 2018. Both models are manufactured in China. An 0 gauge model kit is produced by Agenoria, now marketed by Ragstone Models.

References

External links 

 1361 tank class introduction The Great Western Archive

1361
0-6-0ST locomotives
Railway locomotives introduced in 1910
Standard gauge steam locomotives of Great Britain
Shunting locomotives